Leptodactylus syphax is a species of frog in the family Leptodactylidae. It is found in extreme eastern Bolivia, central to northeastern Brazil, and Paraguay. Common names basin white-lipped frog and whistling foam frog have been coined for it.

Etymology
The specific name syphax is Greek meaning "sweet new wine" and alludes to the bright red color seen in the groin, belly, and ventral surfaces of the thighs and shanks in some living specimens.

Description
Adult males measure  and adult females  in snout–vent length. The tympanum is distinct. Neither dorsal folds nor dorsolateral folds are present; lateral folds are also absent or are largely interrupted. Most specimens have a glandular dorsum with muted, tile-like dorsal pattern of darker and lighter browns. Light upper lip stripe is not present. The belly has light to moderate mottling and light gray or brown markings.

Habitat and conservation
Leptodactylus syphax occurs in open areas, often rocky outcrops, in rock or termite cavities. The tadpoles develop in standing bodies of water, such as quiet side pools of streams. This species can be common in ideal habitat situations, but not otherwise. Overgrazing, agricultural intensification, and fire might be local threats. Its range overlaps with several protected areas.

References

Syphax
Amphibians of Bolivia
Amphibians of Brazil
Amphibians of Paraguay
Amphibians described in 1969
Taxonomy articles created by Polbot